Tabuaeran, also known as Fanning Island, is an atoll that is part of the Line Islands of the central Pacific Ocean and part of Kiribati. The maximum elevation is about 3 m (10 ft) above high tide.

History

Tabuaeran was first inhabited by Polynesian people. Archaeological evidence points to a single large village being maintained for several hundred years on the west side of the atoll with other scattered production and agricultural sites across the atoll. Radiometric dates range from 1100 CE to 1425 CE (Cal. 810 ±50 BP and 620 ± 60 BP at 2 sigma). Continuous habitation is likely as stratigraphic cultural layers are uninterrupted and quite deep. Some archaeologists have argued that Tabuaeran and Kiritimati were one community living across a matched set of islands as despite their relative proximity, their climates and resources differ wildly covering what would otherwise be resource shortages. While this hypothesis is still being tested, the period of human habitation on these two islands does match up. Geochemical analysis of stone tools provides a clear window into trade networks that existed throughout Polynesia and in the case of Tabuaeran, a positive match was made with a quarry located in Eiao, Marquesas.

The first European to sight Tabuaeran was American captain Edmund Fanning of the American ship Betsy on June 11, 1798; it was named for him. At the time, the atoll was uninhabited and, like all of the Line Islands, had no truly native population. After Fanning, it was visited by whalers of several nationalities. The whaler  had wrecked there in late 1831 or early 1832.

By 1854, Captain Henry English and 150 labourers from Manihiki settled, and began producing coconut oil for export.

In about 1857 a whaling ship put ashore William Greig who carried out planting of coconut trees to expand the production of copra, and who also began planting coconut trees on Washington Island. Eventually the sons of Greig owned the plantation with Father  until he sold his interest to the Fanning Island Limited, and started a coconut plantation on Christmas Island.

Captain William Wiseman of  formally annexed Fanning to Great Britain on 15 March 1888.

A deep opening, thereafter called the English Channel, was blasted on the west side of the atoll. Tabuaeran hosted a station on the Canada-to-Australia section of the All Red Line telegraph cable system, beginning in 1902. Fanning Island Post Office opened on 29 November 1902. During World War I, the cable station was visited in September 1914 by the Imperial German Navy light cruiser  and was severely damaged when a landing force went ashore to put the station out of action. In 1939 the atoll was incorporated into the British colony of the Gilbert and Ellice Islands. In 1979, it gained independence, becoming part of the Republic of Kiribati.

An airfield was constructed on  Napari (Napali) islet when the University of Hawaii operated a tide monitoring station on the atoll. The station and the airfield closed in 1981. The airfield reopened in 2016, with regular domestic flights to Kiritimati.

Present
The administrative centre of the atoll is Paelau, on the west side.

Tabuaeran had a population of 1,960 at the 2010 census, principally Gilbertese settlers brought from the main Kiribati archipelago by Fanning Island Plantations, Ltd., to work in the copra industry.

The population declined from 2,539 at the 2005 census following the closure of the secondary school (since reopened), cessation of visits by Norwegian Cruise Line (NCL), and reduced operations by Atoll Seaweed Company.

Eight villages are listed in the 2015 census:

The main diet is imported rice and tinned meats, supplemented by local foods: reef fish and shellfish, babai (Cyrtosperma merkusii), coconut, pigs, chickens, and seaweed (limu).

Major exports are copra and hand crafts (including cowrie shell, shark tooth knives, and Kiribati stamps). An Australian supply ship calls two or three times a year. The sailing vessel Kwai also stops on the island.

The main health centre is located at Paelau in the west, with additional clinics on Napari (Napali) islet in the north and Kimarimari in the south. Helpful organizations with concerns for the local schools, churches and healthcare needs are Pacific CARE Missions and Pacific Island Aid.

Ecology
Overfishing and pollution have impacted on the ocean surrounding the island. In the ocean surrounding uninhabited islands of the Northern Line Islands, sharks comprised 74% of the top predator biomass (329 g m-2) at Kingman Reef and 57% at Palmyra Atoll (97 g m-2), whereas low shark numbers have been observed at Tabuaeran and Kiritimati.

Cruising
Since 2010, the Holland America cruise ships Rotterdam, Westerdam, Eurodam, and Volendam have scheduled visits to Tabuaeran.  Seaborne Cruiseline has scheduled visits since 2012. The visits help the island regain income lost since Norwegian Cruise Line ceased weekly visits in 2007.

Until 2007, NCL ships based in Honolulu visited Tabuaeran weekly, partly to avoid U.S. port charges for foreign-flagged ships (see Passenger Vessel Services Act of 1886). NCL ceased visits after introducing US-flagged ships, changing cruise schedules, and eliminating Tabuaeran as a port of call.

Education
The island has three primary schools, one junior secondary school, and one senior secondary school, Meleangi Tabai High School. The government has previously sought to re-open the high school campus on Kiritimati.

Culture

Tabuaeran features in John Updike's short story "The Blessed Man of Boston, My Grandmother's Thimble, and Fanning Island." It is collected in his books Pigeon Feathers and Other Stories and The Early Stories.

See also
 Kiribati
 List of islands of Kiribati
 List of Guano Island claims
 Fanning Raid

References

External links
Fanning-Island.com
Ancient Polynesian remains
Edmund Fanning in Explorers of the Pacific by Buck (eText)
'Paradise Found?' An account of a tourist visit to Fanning Island

Atolls of Kiribati
Pacific islands claimed under the Guano Islands Act
Line Islands
Gilbert and Ellice Islands
Line Islands (Kiribati)